Neusticurus bicarinatus, the two-faced neusticurus, is a species of lizard in the family Gymnophthalmidae. It is found in  Suriname, French Guiana, Venezuela, Guyana, and Brazil.

References

Neusticurus
Reptiles of Brazil
Reptiles of French Guiana
Reptiles of Guyana
Reptiles of Suriname
Reptiles of Venezuela
Reptiles described in 1758
Taxa named by Carl Linnaeus